Sabita Poudel (Nepali: सबिता पौडेल) is the spouse of Ram Chandra Poudel, President of Nepal who currently serving as First Lady of Nepal.

Personal life
She married Ram Chandra Poudel, and had five children: four daughters and one son.

References 

Living people
 year of birth missing